Duncans Point is a cape on the Pacific Coast of northern California in the United States.

The point lies about halfway between Bodega Head (to the south) and Goat Rock (to the north). It is easily reached from State Route 1. The unincorporated community of Ocean View lies just north of the point.

It shelters a rocky inlet, named Duncans Cove or Duncans Landing, which is part of the Sonoma Coast State Beach. Duncans Landing is notoriously dangerous, due to large waves and strong surf.

History
Duncans Point marked the southern limit of Pomo territory, and Duncans Landing was a place where coastal ships were loaded with food and lumber for export.

The landing site was listed in the National Register of Historic Places on November 12, 1971.

Geology
Duncans Point is an uplifted wave-cut platform.

See also
Bodega Head
Coast Miwok
National Register of Historic Places listings in Sonoma County, California

References

External links

Headlands of California
Landforms of Sonoma County, California
Archaeological sites on the National Register of Historic Places in California
History of Sonoma County, California
National Register of Historic Places in Sonoma County, California